Powązki Cemetery, also known as Stare Powązki, is a historic necropolis located in Wola district, in the western part of Warsaw, Poland. It is the most famous cemetery in the city and one of the oldest, having been established in 1790. It is the burial place of many illustrious individuals from Polish history. Some are interred along the "Avenue of the Distinguished" – Aleja Zasłużonych, created in 1925. It is estimated that over 1 million people are buried at Powązki.

The cemetery is often confused with the newer Powązki Military Cemetery, which is located to the north-west of Powązki Cemetery.

History
Powązki Cemetery was established on 4 November 1790 on land donated by nobleman Melchior Szymanowski, and consecrated on 20 May 1792. Initially it covered an area of only about 2.5 ha. In the same year Saint Karol Boromeusz Church, designed by Dominik Merlini, was built on the northern edge of the cemetery. The catacombs were erected soon thereafter.

Several other cemeteries were founded in the area: the Jewish cemetery, and those of the Calvinist, Lutheran, Caucasian and Tatar communities. The Orthodox cemetery is also located in the vicinity.

As in many old European cemeteries, some of the tombstones in Powązki were created by renowned sculptors, both Polish and foreign. Some of the monuments are examples of the then prevailing styles in art and architecture.

On All Saints Day (1 November) and Zaduszki (2 November) in Warsaw, vigils are held not only in the Roman Catholic cemeteries, but in the Protestant, Muslim, Jewish and Orthodox cemeteries as well. At Powązki Cemetery, many graves are lit up by Votive candles.

Notable burials
A few of the notables buried here are:

 Tekla Bądarzewska-Baranowska (1834–1861), composer
 Izabela Barcińska née Chopin, (1811–1881), younger sister of Fryderyk Chopin
 Anna Bilińska (1857–1893), painter
 Wojciech Bogusławski (1757–1829), writer, actor, director
 Stefan Bryla (1886–1943), notable for first welding bridge-Maurzyce Bridge
 Jan Gotlib Bloch (1836–1902), banker, railroad entrepreneur, philanthropist, economist, economist and social activist
 Emilia Chopin (1812–1827), youngest sister of Fryderyk Chopin
 Ludwika Jędrzejewicz née Chopin (1807–1855), oldest sister of Fryderyk Chopin
 Mikołaj Chopin (1771–1844), father of Fryderyk Chopin
 Tekla Justyna Chopin (1782–1861), mother of Fryderyk Chopin
 Gerard Antoni Ciołek (1909–1966), architect and historian of gardens
 Ignacy Dobrzyński (1807–1867), composer
 Jerzy Duszyński (1917–1978), actor
 Józef Elsner (1769–1854), composer and conductor.  Piano teacher of Fryderyk Chopin.
 Władysław Filipkowski (1892–1950), military commander
 Pola Gojawiczyńska (1896–1963), writer
 Józef Gosławski, (1908–1963), sculptor and medallic artist
 Leopold Janikowski (1855–1942), meteorologist, explorer and ethnographer
 Stanisław Janikowski (1891–1965), Polish diplomat
 Stefan Jaracz (1883–1945), actor
 Jan Kiepura (1902–1966), singer and actor
 Krzysztof Kieślowski (1941–1996), film director
 Jan Kiliński (1760–1819), freedom fighter
 Stefan Kisielewski (1911–1991), art critic and writer
 Stanislava Klimashevskaya (1851–1939), photographer and studio owner
 Tomasz Knapik (1943–2021),  film, radio and television reader
 Krzysztof Komeda (1931–1969), jazz composer
 Alfred Kowalski (1849–1915), painter
 Henryk Kuna (1885–1945), sculptor
 Witold Lutosławski (1913–1994), composer
 Józefat Ignacy Łukasiewicz (1789–1850), painter-artist
 Maciej Masłowski (1901–1976), art historian
 Stanisław Masłowski (1853–1926), painter-artist
 Witold Małcużyński (1914–1977), classical pianist
 Stefan Mazurkiewicz (1888–1945), co-founder of the Warsaw school of mathematics
 Jerzy Mierzejewski (1917–2012), artist and pedagogue
 Stanisław Moniuszko (1819–1872), composer
 Janusz Nasfeter (1920–1998) – film director and screenwriter; moved in 2018 from the Służew Old Cemetery
 Ola Obarska (1910–1992), singer and actress
 Antoni Osuchowski (1849–1928), philanthropist and national activist
 Piotr Pawlukiewicz (1960–2020), Roman Catholic priest, doctor of pastoral theology
 Lech Pijanowski (1928–1974), film-maker and game designer
 Bolesław Prus (1847–1912), journalist and novelist
 Grzegorz Przemyk (1964–1983), poet murdered by Milicja Obywatelska
 Kazimierz Pużak (1883–1950), died in the Communist prison, secretly buried in Powązki
 Władysław Reymont (1867–1925), Nobel Prize-winning novelist
 Edward Rydz-Śmigły (1886–1941), politician, statesman, Marshal of Poland and Commander-in-Chief of Poland's armed forces
 Ireneusz Roszkowski (1910–1996), gynaecologist
 Irena Sendlerowa (1910–2008), head of Children's Section of the Żegota
 Wacław Sierpiński (1882–1969), mathematician
 Andrzej Sołtan (1897–1959), physicist
 Zbigniew Ścibor-Rylski (1917–2018), military commander, participant of the Warsaw Uprising
 Michał Karaszewicz-Tokarzewski (1893–1964), general
 Jerzy Waldorff (1910–1999), art critic and one of the benefactors of the Cemetery
 Melchior Wańkowicz (1892–1974), writer
 Henryk Wieniawski (1835–1870), composer
 Kazimierz Wierzyński (1894–1969), poet and writer
 Stanisław Wigura (1901–1932), aircraft designer and aviator
 Stanisław Wojciechowski (1869–1953), president of Poland
 Aleksander Zelwerowicz (1877–1955), actor and director, patron of the Warsaw Drama Academy
 Franciszek Żwirko (1895–1932), aviator
 Wojciech Żywny (1756–1842), first piano teacher of Fryderyk Chopin, composer.

Gallery

See also
 Rakowicki Cemetery
 Lychakiv Cemetery

References

Wola

Cemeteries in Warsaw
National cemeteries
Roman Catholic cemeteries in Poland
1790 establishments in the Polish–Lithuanian Commonwealth